In statistics, Hoeffding's test of independence, named after Wassily Hoeffding, is a test based on the population measure of deviation from independence

Hoeffding derived an unbiased estimator of  that can be used to test for independence, and is consistent for any continuous alternative. The test should only be applied to data drawn from a continuous distribution, since  has a defect for discontinuous , namely that it is not necessarily zero when . This modified measure is known as Blum–Kiefer–Rosenblatt coefficient.

A paper published in 2008 describes both the calculation of a sample based version of this measure for use as a test statistic, and calculation of the null distribution of this test statistic.

See also

 Correlation
 Kendall's tau
 Spearman's rank correlation coefficient
Distance correlation

References

Primary sources
 Wassily Hoeffding, A non-parametric test of independence, Annals of Mathematical Statistics 19: 293–325, 1948. (JSTOR)
 Hollander and Wolfe, Non-parametric statistical methods (Section 8.7), 1999. Wiley.

Covariance and correlation
Nonparametric statistics
Statistical tests